Wynberg may refer to:

 Wynberg, Cape Town, suburb of Cape Town, South Africa
 Wynberg, Gauteng, suburb of Johannesburg, South Africa

See also
 Wynberg Park, a park in Wynberg, Cape Town, South Africa
 Wynberg St Johns, South African football club